Rosemary Lois Armitage (born 5 December 1955) is an Australian politician, an independent member of the Tasmanian Legislative Council, representing the electoral division of Launceston since her election on 7 May 2011.

Prior to her election to the Legislative Council, Armitage was an alderman in the Launceston City Council. She was elected to the council in 2005, and served as deputy mayor.

References

External links
Official website

1955 births
Living people
Members of the Tasmanian Legislative Council
Independent members of the Parliament of Tasmania
Tasmanian local councillors
21st-century Australian politicians
Women members of the Tasmanian Legislative Council
Women local councillors in Australia
21st-century Australian women politicians